Arielle Free (born 29 March 1988) is a Scottish DJ and broadcaster. She is known for presenting on BBC Radio 1 and touring the world as a celebrated Electronic house DJ. Free also hosts the official podcast Love Island: The Morning After.

Early life
Free is originally from Stirling but moved to Glasgow when she was ten years old. She considers herself to be a Glaswegian. Free began dancing when she was eight years old, and attended the Dance School of Scotland at Knightswood Secondary School.

Career

Film and television
Free acted in the Beauxbatons scenes in Harry Potter and the Goblet of Fire (2005).

Free presented the children's TV show Scrambled! on ITV. While presenting the show on 3 October 2017, Free took part in a world record attempt for the most limbos achieved by a team of 25 people in three minutes. The team set a record of 142 limbos, verified by the Guinness World Records.

Radio and podcasts
Free and Kem Cetinay have co-presented the official Love Island podcast Love Island: The Morning After since 2018.

On 6 September 2019, Free began presenting the weekend early breakfast show on BBC Radio 1, which included Friday, Saturday, and Sunday mornings. In January 2021, she moved to the weekday early breakfast show from Monday to Thursday.

Free is also the voice of Radio 1's Dance live stream and can be heard on the stage 35 hours a week.

As a DJ, Free can often be found playing on Club and Festival bills as well as touring her own club night Free Your Mind. She also has a record label under the same name.

On 21 August 2021, Free and Lawrence Chaney, winner of RuPaul's Drag Race UK season 2, co-hosted a show on BBC Radio 1 in honour of the station's Drag Day.

Music
In January 2022, Free released the single "Soul Full" that she produced with Bristol music duo Mortimer.  The song features vocals by Joe Killington.

Comic Relief Challenge 
On the 5th of March 2023, Free began the Tour De Dance challenge to raise money for the charity Comic Relief. This was a five day event where she completed 50 hours of simultaneous cycling and DJing, touring five UK cities. The challenge was completed on a vehicle powered by ten cyclists, with volunteers joining for sections of the journey in York, Leeds, Sheffield, Manchester, and Liverpool.

Over half a million pounds was raised for Comic Relief in Free's name by the end of the challenge.

References

External links
Radio 1 Early Breakfast (BBC Radio 1)

Living people
1988 births
BBC Radio 1 presenters
Scottish DJs
People from Stirling